Melesio Soto (born 29 November 1941) is a former Mexican cyclist. He competed in the individual road race at the 1964 Summer Olympics.

References

External links
 

1941 births
Living people
Mexican male cyclists
Olympic cyclists of Mexico
Cyclists at the 1964 Summer Olympics
Place of birth missing (living people)
Pan American Games medalists in cycling
Pan American Games bronze medalists for Mexico
Cyclists at the 1963 Pan American Games
21st-century Mexican people
20th-century Mexican people